The World League Wrestling (WLW) Heavyweight Championship, is a professional wrestling championship in independent professional wrestling promotion World League Wrestling. It is the promotion's primary championship.

The championship is generally contested in professional wrestling matches, in which participants execute scripted finishes rather than contend in direct competition. Some reigns were held by champions using a ring name while others use their real name. Moses is the current champion in his first reign.  He won the title in a six-man tag team match featuring himself, Leland Race, and Kyle Roberts against then-champion Derek Stone, Jon Webb, and Camaro Jackson in Troy, Missouri.

The first champion was Steve Sharp, who won the championship on February 12, 1999. The champion with the single longest reign is Trevor Murdoch, who held the title for 448 days. The champion with the most reigns is Homer Jones, who has held the title six times.

Title history

Combined reigns

Footnotes

References

External links
World League Wrestling's official site
 WLW Heavyweight Championship

Heavyweight wrestling championships
World League Wrestling championships